Carlson Island is a rocky island  long and  high, lying in Prince Gustav Channel  southeast of Pitt Point, Trinity Peninsula. It was discovered in 1903 by the Swedish Antarctic Expedition under Otto Nordenskiöld, who named it for Wilhelm Carlson, one of the chief patrons of the expedition.

See also 
 List of Antarctic and sub-Antarctic islands

References 

Islands of Trinity Peninsula